Randall Steven Wright (born January 12, 1961) is a former professional American football quarterback and color commentator who played for the Green Bay Packers from 1984 to 1988 and covered Big Ten football for ESPN for 12 years. In 2016, USA Today named Wright the worst starting quarterback in Packers' history.

High school
Randy Wright attended St. Charles High School in St. Charles, Illinois. He is a member of the St. Charles Saints Hall of Fame.

Randy Wright attended Acton-Boxborough Regional High School in Acton Massachusetts as a sophomore (1976-1977).  He was the Colonial's starting quarterback.

College career
Wright played college football at the University of Wisconsin–Madison.

Professional career
Wright occasionally had the starting role in the 1985 season, sharing this duty with Jim Zorn and Lynn Dickey. Wright played the entire 1986 NFL season as the starter, and shared starting quarterback duties with his successor, Don Majkowski, from 1987 to 1988.

Personal life
After his football career ended, Randy Wright founded and still owns the vending machine company Wright Vending with his wife Kelli.  He also coaches high school football in Sturgeon Bay, WI, as an offensive coordinator and helps run the Trickey Wright quarterback and wide receiver camp.

References

1961 births
Living people
People from St. Charles, Illinois
Players of American football from Illinois
American football quarterbacks
Wisconsin Badgers football players
Green Bay Packers players
College football announcers